Radosław Tomasz Gruk (born 23 April 1971) is a Polish diplomat, an ambassador to Uzbekistan since 2021.

Life 
Radosław Gruk earned his master's degree from political science at the University of Warsaw.

After graduating, in 1999 he began his professional career at the Ministry of Interior and Administration specializing in the matters related to Polish citizenship. In 2000, he joined the Office for Foreigners where he was in charge of repatriation of Poles from the former Soviet Union. He was cooperating with the Radom Airport and Polish National Tourist Office.

In 2003, Gruk joined the Ministry of Foreign Affairs. Until 2007, he was Second and First Secretary at the Consulate-General in Saint Petersburg, Russia. Between 2007 and 2013 he was Consul and political-economic officer at the rank of Counsellor and First Counsellor at the Embassy in Podgorica, Montenegro. In 2015, he was sent to the Consulate-General in Almaty, Kazakhstan, being promoted to the head of unit and, since 2017, Consul General. In 2019, he ended his term and became deputy director of the MFA Bureau of Human Resources. In 2020, he was nominated Ambassador to Uzbekistan, beginning his term on 8 May 2021. He has been accredited also to Tajikistan. On 25 August 2021, he presented his credentials to the President of Uzbekistan Shavkat Mirziyoyev.

He is married to Monika Gruk who is also a diplomat.

Honours 

 2016 – Honorary Badge of the Siberian
 2016 – Pro Patria Medal
 2017 – Golden Badge of Honor for Merits to the Siberian Association
 2018 – Honorary badge "For Merit for Tourism"
 2018 – Badge "For Merit for Sport"
 2018 – Bene Merito Dioecesis Bydgostiensis
 2019 – Medal „Za Zasługi dla Polaków w Kazachstanie”
 2020 – Gold Cross of Merit
 2021 – Medal of the Centenary of Regained Independence

References 

1971 births
Ambassadors of Poland to Uzbekistan
Consuls-General of Poland
Living people
People from Katowice
Recipients of the Gold Cross of Merit (Poland)
Recipients of the Pro Patria Medal
University of Warsaw alumni